Retiro (Spanish for retirement or retreat) may refer to:

Places
Retiro, Antioquia, a municipality in Antioquia, Colombia
Retiro, Buenos Aires, a neighbourhood in Buenos Aires, Argentina
Retiro bus station, the main bus terminal in Buenos Aires, Argentina
Retiro railway station, a railway station complex in Buenos Aires comprising:
Retiro (Line C Buenos Aires Underground)
Retiro (Line E Buenos Aires Underground)
Retiro Belgrano railway station, serving the Belgrano Norte Line and the General Manuel Belgrano Railway
Retiro Mitre railway station, serving the Mitre Line and the General Bartolomé Mitre Railway
Retiro San Martín railway station, serving the San Martín Line and the General San Martín Railway
Retiro, Chile, a municipality in Chile
Retiro (Madrid), a district in Madrid, Spain
Parque del Buen Retiro, a park in Madrid, Spain
Retiro (Madrid Metro), a station on Line 2
Retiro, San Germán, Puerto Rico, a barrio
Retiro Island (Brasília), an island in Lake Paranoá, Brazil

Other uses
Retiro (spider), a genus of spiders

See also 
El Retiro (disambiguation)